Gibran Rayo Najera (born October 14, 2001) is an American professional soccer player who plays as a forward for Columbus Crew 2 in MLS Next Pro.

Rayo played for North Texas SC while still a member of the FC Dallas Academy in 2019 and rejoined North Texas for the 2020 season.

Rayo signed with defending 2022 MLS Next Pro champions Columbus Crew 2 on December 22, 2022.

Honors
North Texas SC
USL League One Regular Season Title: 2019
USL League One Championship: 2019

References

External links
 
 Gibran Rayo at FC Dallas

2001 births
Living people
American soccer players
Association football forwards
North Texas SC players
Soccer players from Dallas
USL League One players
American sportspeople of Mexican descent
Rochester New York FC players
Columbus Crew 2 players
United States men's youth international soccer players
Mexico youth international footballers
MLS Next Pro players